Waiting for Daylight may refer to:

 Waiting for Daylight (A1 album), 2010
 "Waiting for Daylight" (song), its title song
 Waiting for Daylight (Infernal album), 2000